Jordan Creek Falls drops  along Jordan Creek in Skagit County, Washington.

Sources
 Waterfalls Northwest

Landforms of Skagit County, Washington
Waterfalls of Washington (state)
North Cascades of Washington (state)